Kostas Lamprou (born 18 September 1991) is a Greek professional footballer who plays as a goalkeeper for Eerste Divisie club Willem II.

Club career

Early years
Born in Athens, Lamprou started at amateur club Atromitos Elpida and was scouted by Dutch club Ajax at an international indoor football tournament, where he played as a guest player with the youth of Panathinaikos. He joined Ajax's youth academy at the age of thirteen but was released after six months. After this, he went to play with the amateurs of Amstelveen/Heemraad. There, he stood out among the scouts of Feyenoord and entered their youth academy at Varkenoord. At the age of sixteen, he signed his first professional contract.

Feyenoord
Lamprou made his Feyenoord debut in the 2009–10 preseason. A year later, Lamprou went on loan to Excelsior but returned to Feyenoord during the winter break after failing to establish himself in the first team at Woudestein. He was given a first-team squad number at De Kuip and was named among the substitutes for a number of Eredivisie games.

Lamprou's official debut came in the KNVB Cup against AGOVV Apeldoorn on 20 September 2011, a 4–0 win for Feyenoord. He spent the rest of the season as second-choice keeper behind Erwin Mulder. The former Sparta Rotterdam and PSV goalkeeper Pim Doesburg commented: "Lamprou is a fantastic keeper. I think he'll have to surrender his spot, management will prefer Mulder. But if it were up to me, I would always leave him in. He has a good kick, good reflexes, is agile and has been playing very well recently. They tell him he is too short. That's ridiculous, no one has ever said I was too short. Lamprou has incredible leaping ability."

Loan to Willem II
On 4 July 2014, Willem II finalised the loan deal of Lamprou, agreeing to a season-long loan. At Willem II, he joined the established goalkeepers David Meul and Mattijs Branderhorst. Lamprou himself was happy with the chance to play for Willem II. "I have a good feeling about the discussions we have had. I hope we can make a nice season developing my skills even further."

Willem II
On 19 May 2015, after his exceptional year with Willem II, the club's technical director Carlos Aalbers announced the permanent signing of the Greek international for the next two years: "Kostas fits into the play of Willem II and he has proved last season in the Eredivisie that he is a very good goalkeeper. We are therefore pleased that we sign with him for the next two years." As a loanee of Feyenoord, Lamprou had played his best season so far. A return to De Kuip was not at issue, since the Greek keeper received a new contract. However, from mid-April Willem II were in talks of securing a longer stay for Lamprou in Tilburg. Willem II coach Jurgen Streppel described the goalkeeper as a someone who could further develop his skillset at the club. After a difficult start, he had become one of the pillars of the success of Willem II, who ended in ninth place in the Eredivisie.

He started the 2015–16 season as the starting goalkeeper. On 14 September 2015, in the fifth matchday of Eredivisie in an away game against his former club Feyenoord, he had a number of great saves but could ultimately not avoid a defeat. After a difficult season, where the club fought relegation, he started the 2016–17 season as the undisputable starter. On 4 December 2016, in a 0–0 home draw against FC Twente, he reached 100 appearances in Eredivisie.

Ajax
On 1 August 2017, Lamprou signed a one-year contract with Dutch club Ajax, becoming the fourth Greek in history to wear the colors of the club after Nikos Machlas, Yannis Anastasiou and Angelos Charisteas. The 26-year-old goalkeeper signed from Willem II, after two excellent seasons with them as a free transfer, even though he knew that he started as a third option. In the beginning of the season he played for Jong Ajax, and on 25 October 2017 he made his debut with the first team in a 4–1 away win KNVB game against De Dijk. Eventually, on 6 May 2018, the Greek goalie was finally handed his Eredivisie debut with Ajax and by saving five Excelsior shots he guided his team to a 2–1 away win, sealing UEFA Champions League participation for the following season.

On 2 July 2018, he renewed his contract with Ajax until the end of the 2018–19 season.

Vitesse
On 16 July 2019, after two years with Ajax, Lamprou signed a one-year contract with another Dutch club Vitesse for an undisclosed fee.

Waalwijk

On 30 June 2020, RKC Waalwijk announced that Lamprou has signed with the club on a free transfer until 2021.

Zwolle

On 11 June 2021, it was announced that Lamprou had signed a 2-year contract for Zwolle, with the coming season being his 12th consecutive season in the Netherlands.

Return to Willem II
Lamprou returned to Willem II on 12 June 2022, signing a two-year contract with the recently relegated Eerste Divisie side.

International career
Lamprou's consistency meant his first international call up in October 2012 from Fernando Santos, the coach of Greece national football team.

Career statistics

Honours	
Jong Ajax	
 Eerste Divisie: 2017–18

Ajax
 Eredivisie: 2018–19
 KNVB Cup: 2018–19

Individual
Eredivisie Team of the Month: October 2020, November 2020, February 2021

References

External links

 
 Official Kostas Lamprou profile on Feyenoord.nl 
 Voetbal International profile 
  "De roots van Kostas Lamprou" (video), Feyenoord TV

1991 births
Living people
Association football goalkeepers
Footballers from Athens
Greek footballers
Greece under-21 international footballers
Greece youth international footballers
Greek expatriate footballers
Expatriate footballers in the Netherlands
Greek expatriate sportspeople in the Netherlands
Eredivisie players
Eerste Divisie players
Feyenoord players
Excelsior Rotterdam players
Willem II (football club) players
AFC Ajax players
Jong Ajax players
SBV Vitesse players
RKC Waalwijk players
PEC Zwolle players